A. grandis may refer to:
 Abies grandis, the grand fir, giant fir, lowland white fir, great silver fir, Western white fir, Vancouver fir or Oregon fir, a tree species native to the Pacific Northwest and Northern California of North America
 Aeshna grandis, the brown hawker, a large dragonfly species widespread in England
 Alternanthera grandis, a plant species endemic to Ecuador
 Angistorhinus grandis, an extinct phytosaur species found in Texas and Wyoming in the United States and that lived from the Late Triassic period
 Astelia grandis, a plant species in the genus Astelia native to New Zealand
 Aublysodon grandis, a nomen dubium given to a large number of carnivorous dinosaur teeth

See also
 Grandis (disambiguation)